Jürgen Scheibe (born 22 October 1968) is a retired German freestyle wrestler. He competed at the 1988, 1992, 1996, and 2000 Olympics with the best result of seventh place in 1992. Scheibe won two medals at the European championships, in 1989 and 1995.

Scheibe retired from competitions in 2001 to become a wrestling coach for the German women's (2001–2009) and junior men's (2009–) national teams.

References

External links
 

1968 births
Living people
German male sport wrestlers
Wrestlers at the 1988 Summer Olympics
Wrestlers at the 1992 Summer Olympics
Wrestlers at the 1996 Summer Olympics
Wrestlers at the 2000 Summer Olympics
Olympic wrestlers of Germany
People from Aschaffenburg
Sportspeople from Lower Franconia
20th-century German people
21st-century German people